The Royal Victorian Order is an order of knighthood awarded by the sovereign of the United Kingdom and several Commonwealth realms. It is granted personally by the monarch and recognises personal service to the monarchy, the Royal Household, royal family members, and the organisation of important royal events. The order was officially created and instituted on 23 April 1896 by letters patent under the Great Seal of the Realm by Queen Victoria. It was instituted with five grades, Knight Grand Cross (GCVO), Knight Commander (KCVO), Commander (CVO), Member (fourth class) and Member (fifth class), the last two of which were abbreviated to MVO. The two highest conferred the status of knighthood on holders; in 1984, the grade of Member (fourth class) was renamed Lieutenant (LVO), and holders of the fifth grade became Members. Women were not admitted until 1936; those receiving the highest two awards were styled Dames and those grades, when conferred on women, are Dame Grand Cross and Dame Commander (DCVO). The order could also be conferred on foreigners, who were typically appointed to honorary grades and were thus not entitled to the styles, such as Sir and Dame, associated with ordinary grades.

Appointed by King Edward VII 

The list below is ordered by date of appointment. Full names, styles, ranks and titles are given where applicable, as correct at the time of appointment to the order. Branch of service or regiment details are given in parentheses to distinguish them from offices. The offices listed are those given in the official notice, printed in the London Gazette. Where applicable, the occasion is given that was listed either with the notices or in published material elsewhere, in which case that material is cited.

References

Notes

Citations

Bibliography 
 P. Duckers (2004), British Orders and Decorations (Princes Risborough: Shire Publications Ltd)
 P. Galloway, D. Stanley, D. Martin (1996), Royal Service, volume 1 (London: Victorian Publishing)
 M. H. Massue (1909), The Nobilities of Europe (London: Melville and Company)
 C. McCreery (2008), On Her Majesty's Service: Royal Honours and Recognition in Canada (Toronto: Dundurn Press)

British honours system
Royal Victorian Order
Royal Victorian